Šmatai is a village in Jonava district municipality, Kaunas County, central Lithuania. According to the 2011 census, the village has a population of 10 people.

Climate
The Köppen Climate Classification subtype for this climate is "Dfb" (Warm Summer Continental Climate).

References

Villages in Jonava District Municipality